Mary M. Caferro is a Democratic member of the Montana House of Representatives, having first served between 2005 and 2011, and again starting in 2019. From 2011 to 2019 she served as a Democratic member of the Montana Senate.

Personal life
The mother of four children, Caferro is currently the director of The Arc Montana.

References

Democratic Party members of the Montana House of Representatives
Democratic Party Montana state senators
Living people
Women state legislators in Montana
21st-century American politicians
21st-century American women politicians
1959 births